Aidan O'Neill, (Scot) KC (born 1961) is a Scottish advocate, barrister, and King's Counsel.

He has pleaded almost thirty times before the Supreme Court of the United Kingdom and House of Lords, as well before the Court of Justice of the European Union and the European Court of Human Rights.

He appeared for Joanna Cherry MP before the Supreme Court of the United Kingdom in the September 2019 case relating to the prorogation of Parliament.

Career
O'Neill read Law from 1978 to 1982, obtaining a First Class LL.B. (Hons.) degree from the University of Edinburgh. He then studied a Diploma in Legal Practice also at Edinburgh from 1982 to 1983.

He studied at the University of Sydney from 1983 to 1985, obtaining a First Class LL.M. (Hons.) degree where he wrote his thesis on “The Foundations and Structures of Legal Reasoning: an investigation into the role and scope of practical reasoning in our understanding of the law”.

O'Neill was called to the Faculty of Advocates in July 1987. In July 1999 he was appointed Queen's Counsel (QC) in Scotland.

He obtained a further LL.M. degree from the European University Institute after studying there between 1991 and 1992. His degree was in Comparative, International and European law and he produced a thesis titled “The Government of Judges: a study in judicial politics and the rule of law”.

O'Neill holds rare “double silk” status, having become a Scottish QC in 1999, and more recently taking silk in England and Wales in 2017.

From 1997 to 1999 O'Neill was Standing Junior Counsel to the Scottish Office Education and Industry Department.

He is a member of Ampersand Advocates in Scotland. He joined his present London chambers, Matrix Chambers of Gray's Inn, London in 2000, and became a member in 2010.

He was awarded a doctoral degree (LL.D) from the University of Edinburgh in 2012 on the basis of his work's academic merits, independent scholarship and legal substance of published books.

O'Neill was appointed Queen's Counsel in England and Wales in February 2017.

He called to the Bar of Ireland in December 2020.

He was appointed by a cross-party group of 75 MPs and peers to contest a case for judicial review against the Government in the Scottish Court of Session. He went on to receive widespread media coverage in September 2019 upon representing the group including Joanna Cherry MP against the government (represented by Advocate General for Scotland, Lord Keen QC) in the case of R (Miller) v Prime Minister; Cherry & Ors v Advocate General for Scotland.

In the case he contested the use of prorogation powers by Prime Minister Boris Johnson. He was cited in media reports as passionately arguing to the justices that the "Mother of parliaments been shut down by the father of lies".

Specialisms 
Ampersand Advocates describe O'Neill as having particular experience and expertise in commercial judicial review, environmental/Aarhus law and in employment/equality law. He is also specialist in EU law, in human rights law and in UK constitutional law.

Noted cases

 2018 - Case C-621/18 Wightman v. Secretary of State [2018] CSOH 8 & [2018] CSIH 62 - a case regarding Article 50 TEU notification which ended up in the CJEU, who ruled the notification is unilaterally revocable by the UK
 2017 - Case C-333/14 Scotch Whisky Association and others v. Scottish Ministers re minimum alcohol pricing [2017] UKSC 76; [2016] CSIH 77; EU:C:2015:845; [2014] CSIH 38; [2013] CSOH 70 – a case regarding the compatibility of the Scottish Alcohol Act 2012 with Article 34 TFEU on free movement of goods
 2017 - R (Miller) v Secretary of State for Exiting the European Union  [2017] UKSC 5 - a case querying if the UK Government could rely upon prerogative powers to trigger Article 50 TEU to leave the EU
 2013 - Bulls v. Preddy and Hall [2013] UKSC 73 – a case about whether Christian guesthouse owners could refuse a double bed room to a civil partnership couple on grounds of religious conviction

Personal life 
O'Neill speaks and writes in French and Italian, and has knowledge of German.

Publications

Awards

References

External links 
 Page at Matrix Chambers

1960 births
Living people
Lawyers from Edinburgh
Alumni of the University of Edinburgh
Members of Gray's Inn
British King's Counsel